The stumptooth minnow (Stypodon signifer) is an extinct species of cyprinid fish.
It was found only in Mexico.

Sources

Cyprinid fish of North America
Fish of Mexico
Fish described in 1881
Leuciscinae
Taxonomy articles created by Polbot